Charles Sumner Benedict (May 5, 1867 – November 22, 1952) was an American sport shooter, who competed in the 1908 Summer Olympics.

He was born in Barlow Township and died in Gallipolis, Ohio.

In the 1908 Olympics he won a gold medal in the team military rifle event and finished 13th in the 1000 yard free rifle event.

References

External links
profile
America's early Olympic champions
NOTE: a) Charles Sumner Benedict b 5 Mar 1858 son of George A. Benedict & E. Beardsley  b) 'Olympian' Charles Sumner Benedict b 5 May 1867 in Ohio, son of Henry Nelson Benedict and Martha Brabahm -  c) Dr. Charles Sumner Benedict b 9 Dec 1856 in New York, son of Joseph Benedict & Mary E. Goldey -  . 
Note: These three men are 6th cousins and are all descendants of 'The Immigrant' Thomas Benedict b 1617 and Mary Bridghum.

1867 births
1952 deaths
American male sport shooters
ISSF rifle shooters
Shooters at the 1908 Summer Olympics
Olympic gold medalists for the United States in shooting
People from Gallipolis, Ohio
Olympic medalists in shooting
Medalists at the 1908 Summer Olympics